Chaudhry Iftikhar Hussain is a Pakistani politician who had been a member of the Provincial Assembly of the Punjab from August 2018 till January 2023.

Political career

He was elected to the Provincial Assembly of the Punjab as a candidate of Pakistan Tehreek-e-Insaf from Constituency PP-81 (Sargodha-X) in 2018 Pakistani general election.

Chaudhry Iftikhar Gondal's Imran Khan's tireless soldier !!!

Chaudhry Sahib is a player on the PTI front foot who played a smoky innings for the PTI in the 2013 elections and caused a wave of trouble in the opposition camp.  Despite the fatigue in the elections, his stability has not faltered and public service, liaison and loyalty to the party is still remained.  

Iftikhar Gondal made every sacrifice for the PTI and as Imran Khan's soldier, he persevered in every movement and front against the government, even he denied Grade 18 government job which was for his son Zia-ur-Rehman Gondal.

References

Living people
Punjab MPAs 2018–2023
Pakistan Tehreek-e-Insaf MPAs (Punjab)
Year of birth missing (living people)